Chalkbeat is a non-profit news organization that covers education in several American communities. Its mission is to "inform the decisions and actions that lead to better outcomes for children and families by providing deep, local coverage of education policy and practice." It aims to cover "the effort to improve schools for all children, especially those who have historically lacked access to a quality education". Its areas of focus include under-reported stories, education policy, equity, trends, and local reporting.

Chalkbeat was founded as GothamSchools in 2008 by Elizabeth Green and Philissa Cramer. It merged with EdNews Colorado, founded by Alan Gottlieb, in 2013, and then redesigned and relaunched the website as Chalkbeat one year later. Chalkbeat has eight bureaus where it reports news regularly: Chicago, Colorado, Detroit, Indiana, Newark, New York City, Philadelphia, and Tennessee.

In New York City, Chalkbeat's competitors include three daily newspapers and a public radio station with an education-focused blog. Another key competitor is Capital Education, owned by Politico.

In 2016, Chalkbeat clarified its expectations, standards and editorial practices by unveiling a formal "code of ethics" that covers all its bureaus. Chalkbeat has also introduced an open-source impact tracking platform called MORI (Measures of Our Reporting's Influence).

History 
Chalkbeat began as a merger of GothamNews/GothamSchools in New York City and EdNews Colorado in Denver. GothamSchools was founded in 2008 by Elizabeth Green and Philissa Cramer, who started off with a local New York City education blog. From the beginning, they received requests to expand their coverage to other parts of the country. The organization was initially funded by Open Plans, a technology non-profit founded by Mark Gorton. EdNews Colorado started as a magazine and was developed by Alan Gottlieb.

GothamNews and EdNews Colorado merged in January 2013 and were relaunched jointly as a national network, first known as Education News Netowrk and then as Chalkbeat. Green said the organizations "decided to merge because it's hard to build a sustainable business around journalism". Though the existing brands had loyal followings, "there is power in numbers. It made sense that we should all have one name." The new organization started additional bureaus in Memphis and Indianapolis. These new bureau locations were chosen for having a lot of changes or possibilities in their local education policy as well as local foundation support.

Chalkbeat raised $2.2 million in revenue in 2013, most of which came from philanthropic funding and about one third from ads and job boards listings. As the organization has expanded, it has attracted more funding from foundational donors and individuals. Donors include local foundations as well as the Bill & Melinda Gates Foundation, the Ford Foundation, and the Walton Family Foundation, each of which gives between $200,000 and $400,000 per year as of 2016.

In the year 2016, Chalkbeat had approximately 250,000 visitors per month. About one quarter of readers work for education non-profits, another quarter are teachers, 11 percent are researchers or policymakers, and 10 percent are parents, according to Green. Their target audience includes both "education insiders" and interested people who care about education inequality.

Chalkbeat expanded to Detroit in early 2017, and later that year it announced plans to expand to Chicago and Newark in 2018.

In 2020, The Philadelphia Public School Notebook joined Chalkbeat to create Chalkbeat Philadelphia.

In October 2020, Chalkbeat launched Votebeat, a project to report on local issues related to voting, starting with the 2020 United States election and with plans to continue through the 2022 midterm election. Votebeat has received funding from the Institute for Nonprofit News as well as other donors.

Elizabeth Green 
Elizabeth Green is the co-founder, CEO, and editor-in-chief of Chalkbeat. Green, who is based in New York City, studied teaching methods in the U.S. and Japan for six years. Her book Building a Better Teacher, launched with a New York Times magazine story, discusses the principles behind teaching skills and how complicated teaching can be. She believes that good teachers "are not born, they're made", and that "teaching must itself be taught". The book covers how teachers can be more effective and how policymakers can improve educators' skills. Green previously worked for U.S. News & World Report and The New York Sun, where she covered education. She realized the importance of covering news from pre-school education to higher education, including issues ranging from school policies to politics, and wanted to write about education on a local level. This is why Chalkbeat mainly focuses on education news in local communities.

Code of ethics 
Chalkbeat originally adopted a code of ethics to govern the conduct of its team members in 2015. In 2016 it announced a new formal code of ethics in order to formalize existing practices and ensure consistency within the organization. Its code of ethics draws inspiration from other nonprofit news organizations, including The Marshall Project, ProPublica, The Texas Tribune, and the Center for Investigative Reporting, as well as from professional organizations such as the Education Writers Association and the Society for Professional Journalists.

Impact tracking (MORI) 

MORI (Measures of Our Reporting's Influence) is an open-source WordPress plugin for tracking and reporting the impact of an organization's journalism, which Chalkbeat developed in 2014. It has "deep ties to Google Analytics, as well as its own built-in taxonomies for detailed story types and impact types." It was initially only used privately within the organization, but after two years, Chalkbeat announced the open-source release of the MORI Impact Tracker plugin, as the first product in the MORI Platform. The impact tracker allows users to record impacts individually, review impacts over time by searching and sorting them, and export lists of impacts to a spreadsheet for further data crunching and sharing. Users can attach impacts to a particular WordPress post or a broader category or tag or stand alone. MORI also has a dashboard widget to display the latest impacts.

MORI includes article-tagging, event-tracking and goal measurement. Journalists categorize the article by type and then identify the target audience before posting or publishing an article. They can also add a narrative description and an impact tag to the article page in the content management system (CMS) if there is a meaningful offline event related to the article. MORI requires editors to set goals before publishing, and metrics are provided in terms of progress to those goals. Goals can be set in categories such as Content Production, Content Consumption, and Engagement.

At first, Chalkbeat was unsure whether its journalists would use MORI, but the reception was positive, with reporters and editors enthusiastic about making use of the data it produced.

The MORI Cycle

The three-part "MORI Cycle" enables Chalkbeat to determine which types of stories led to the most impact, so that the team can plan to write more of them.

Reception 

Chalkbeat has been praised for offering balanced, nuanced reporting on local education issues; Cornelia Grumman wrote that the organization's reporting "humanizes schools" instead of buying into a simplistic negative narrative.

The organization's funding model has led to criticism from those who see a conflict of interest and feel that Chalkbeat is too focused on "a reform-minded policy community". Chalkbeat says that it has editorial independence and that its coverage of reforms is not always positive.

Awards  

Awards listed below are referenced from the Chalkbeat official website.

2018 

 Green Eyeshade Awards (SPJ Southeasthern US)

2017 

 AERA Awards for Excellence in Education Research 
 Colorado Press Association
 Education Writers Association Awards
 Best in Indiana Journalism (SPJ Indiana)
 Excellence in Journalism (SPJ Detroit)
 Green Eyeshade Awards (SPJ Southeastern US)
 Top of the Rockies (SPJ Region 9)

2016 

 Education Writers Association Awards
 Best in Indiana Journalism (SPJ Indiana)
 Top of the Rockies (SPJ Region 9)

2015 

 Education Writers Association Awards
 Best in Indiana Journalism (SPJ Indiana)

2014 

 Education Writers Association Awards
 Best in Indiana Journalism (SPJ Indiana)

2013 

 Education Writers Association Awards

2011 

 Education Writers Association Awards

2010 

 Education Writers Association Awards

2009 

 Education Writers Association Awards

References

External links
 
 Votebeat

American news websites
Non-profit organizations based in New York City
WordPress
Nonprofit newspapers
Organizations established in 2014
Internet properties established in 2014
2014 establishments in the United States